Carcione is an Italian surname. Notable people with the surname include:

 Imperio Carcione (born 1982), Italian footballer
 Joe Carcione (1914–1988), American consumer advocate

Italian-language surnames